Osasco is a municipality in São Paulo State, Brazil, located in the Greater São Paulo and ranking 5th in population among São Paulo municipalities. According to the IBGE 2015, Osasco currently has the 9th highest gross domestic product in Brazil, and the 2nd largest in the State of São Paulo. The population is 699,944 (2020 est.) in an area of 64.95 km2. It is among the world's more dense cities, similar in density to Tokyo and New York City.  It's considered the major urban centre of the Western portion of the Greater São Paulo. It used to be a district of São Paulo City until February 19, 1962, when Osasco became a municipality of its own. The city motto is "Urbs labor", a Latin phrase that means "City work".

History

Pre-Columbian era
The region that is now Osasco was inhabited by indigenous Tupi-Guaraní people.

Colonial Brazil
Bandeirantes lived in the region that is now Osasco, then called "Vila de Quitaúna". The famous "bandeirante" António Raposo Tavares lived there.

Early modern period
Osasco was founded in the 19th century by Italian immigrant Antônio Giuseppe Agù (currently the name of one of the main streets in Osasco). He came from commune Osasco in the province of Turin, Italy.

Immigrants from Italy, Spain, Portugal, Germany, Armenia, Lebanon, Israel and Japan came to Osasco during the late 19th Century and early 20th Century, and their descendants form the bulk of Osasco's population.

Independence
Osasco became autonomous from the city of São Paulo on February 19, 1962.

Some widely known events after the autonomy

 Strike of the Cobrasma factory (1968)
 Explosion of the Osasco Plaza Shopping (1996).
 The first Latin American flight was in Osasco, in 1910, by

Economy

Osasco was an industrial city but there was industrial decentralization to other regions and today the city is moving toward the retail and service industries. Osasco is the location of the headquarters of Bradesco, the third largest bank in Brazil. Currently there are a number of large companies with a presence in the city, such as Natura, Coca-Cola, Carrefour, Wal-Mart, Colgate-Palmolive and many others. Osasco is the ninth richest city in the country.
GDP of Osasco: R$ 58,566,199,000

Main companies

 ABB Group
 Adamas S/A Papéis e Papeloes Especiais
 Ambev
 ArvinMeritor
 Associação Comercial e Empresarial de Osasco (ACEO)
 Avon
 Bradesco
 Carrefour
 Chevron
 Coca-Cola
 Colgate-Palmolive
 Danfoss do Brasil
 Ebicen
 Group Extrema
 Hot Stock
 Havan
 Intermarine
 Ifood
 Makro
 Mercado Car
 Mercado Livre
 Metrópoles home e club
 Natura
 Nova Osasco Esquadrias
 Osram
 Desentupidora HP
 Pão de Açúcar
 Pedágio Sem Parar
 Rede TV
 Rockwell International

 Sam's Club
 SBT
 Unibanco – CPD
 Uber
 Wal-Mart

Market city
Market city of Osasco

Shopping Malls
 Shopping União de Osasco
 Osasco Plaza Shopping
 Super Shopping Osasco
 Shopping Galeria
 Fantasy Shopping

Banks

Banco do Brasil
Banco Safra
Bradesco
Caixa Econômica Federal
Citibank
HSBC
Itaú
Santander
Unibanco

Sport

Sports clubs
Finasa Volleyball
Grêmio Esportivo Osasco Football
Sollys/Osasco
Associação Cristã de Moços/ACM
SESI Osasco
Clube Floresta
Clube dos Subtenentes e Sargentos do II Exército

Sports competitions
Racing of Saint Antônio
University games
Racing and walk – Marketing Sports
Osasco went prime city make  Circuito Running for Nature, racing and walk (SportsFuse).

Geography
Is an average elevation of 792 meters and 65 km2 of area.
 Its boundaries are São Paulo to the north, east and south, Cotia to the southwest, Carapicuíba and Barueri to the west and Santana de Parnaíba to the northwest.

Climate

As in almost all the metropolitan area of São Paulo, the climate is subtropical, specifically humid subtropical. The average annual temperature is around 18 °C, being the month of July the coldest (average 12 °C) and warmest February (average 30 °C). The annual rainfall is around 1400 mm.

Hydrography
Baronesa Stream
Bussocaba Stream
Divisa Stream
Continental Stream
Areia Stream
Chico Mendes Lake
Três Montanhas Lake
João Alves Ribeira
Red Ribeira
Tietê River

Demography

Total: 652.593 inhabitants, 2000.
 Urban: 652.593
 Rural: 0
Demographic density (hab./km2): 10,055
Child mortality until 1 year (in 1000): 15.62
Life expectancy (years): 71.35
Fertility (children per women): 1.94
Literacy: 94.24%
HDI : 0.818
 HDI-M Income: 0.769
 HDI-M Longevity: 0.772
 HDI-M Education: 0.913
(Source: IPEA data)
Changing demographics of the city of Osasco

Source: IBAM

Ethnicity 

Source: IBGE

Religion

Source: IBGE 2000

Main Neighbourhoods

Adalgisa
Aliança
Ayrosa
Baronesa
Bela Vista
Bonança
Bonfim
Bussocaba City
Castelo Branco
Centro
Cidade das Flores
Cidade de Deus
Cipava
Cipava II
City Bussocaba
Conceição
Conjunto Metalúrgicos
Continental
Distrito Industrial Altino
Distrito Industrial Anhanguera
Distrito Industrial Autonomistas
Distrito Industrial Centro
Distrito Industrial Mazzei
Distrito Industrial Remédios
Helena Maria
IAPI
Jaguaribe
Jardim Açucará
Jardim Agua Boa
Jardim das Bandeiras
Jardim D'Abril
Jardim D'Avila
Jardim das Flores
Jardim Elvira
Jardim Guadalupe
Jardim Iguaçu
Jardim Ipê
Jardim Joelma
Jardim Mutinga
Jardim Oriental
Jardim Piratininga
Jardim Platina
Jardim Roberto
Jardim Veloso
Jardim São Victor
km 18
Munhoz Júnior
Novo Osasco
Padroeira II
Paiva Ramos
Parque Cachoeirinha
Parque Palmares
Pestana
Portal D'Oeste
Presidente Altino
Quitaúna
Raposo Tavares
Remédios
Recanto das Rosas
Rochdale
Santa Fé
Santa Maria
Santo Antônio
São Pedro
Setor Militar
Três Montanhas
Umuarama
Vila Campesina
Vila Menck
Vila Militar
Vila Osasco
Vila São José
Vila Yara
Vila Yolanda

Transportation

 
Due to its proximity to São Paulo, it is largely served by the CPTM commuter rail service, as well as many roads, providing a seamless connection into the state capital.

Main Streets

Avenida dos Autonomistas
Viaduto Reinaldo de Oliveira
Avenida Maria Campos
Avenida Bussocaba/Avenida Prefeito Hirant Sanazar
Viaduto Presidente Tancredo Neves
Avenida Presidente Médici
Avenida Getúlio Vargas
Avenida Visconde de Nova Granada/Avenida Sport Club Corinthians Paulista
Avenida Santo Antônio
Avenida Antônio Carlos Costa
Rua da Estação
Avenida Pedro Pinho
Avenida João de Andrade
Avenida Sarah Veloso
Complexo Viário Fuad Auada
Avenida Hilário Pereira de Souza
Avenida Franz Voegelli
Avenida Benedito Alves Turíbio
Avenida Giuseppe Sacco
Avenida Padre Vicente Mellilo/Avenida Prestes Maia
Avenida Novo Osasco

Train
It is linked by CPTM rapid transit to São Paulo by the 8 and 9 train lines.

Roads
Roads of Osasco:
Rodovia Castelo Branco (SP-280),
Rodovia Anhangüera (SP-330),
Rodoanel Mário Covas (SP-21) and
Rodovia Raposo Tavares (SP-270).

Airports of São Paulo

São Paulo has two main airports:
The São Paulo-Guarulhos International Airport (IATA: GRU) for the international flights
The Congonhas-São Paulo Airport (IATA: CGH) for domestic and regional flights. Another airport, the Campo de Marte Airport, serves light aircraft and helicopters.

Bus Companies
 Viação Osasco
 Auto Viação Urubupungá

Bus station
 Terminus Amador Aguiar (Vila Yara)
 Terminus Largo de Osasco
 Bus station of Osasco

Media

Newspaper
 Diário da Região;
 Visão Oeste;
 Página Zero;
 Correio Paulista;
 Jornal do Trem;

Newsweb
 Portal PlanetaOsasco.com;
 Webdiário;

Radio
 Nova Difusora 1540 AM e;
 Rádio Iguatemi AM.
 Radio Terra FM.
 Osascoradioweb

Channels

 Sistema Brasileiro de Televisão (SBT), channel 04 VHF (São Paulo);
 Nova Geração de Televisão (NGT), channel 48 UHF;
 TV Shop Tour channel 46 UHF;
 TV Osasco, channel 22 UHF;
 Net Serviços de Comunicação e;
 RedeTV, channel 09 VHF (São Paulo).

Government

Executive
Mayors of Osasco
 Hirant Sanazar (1962–1967)
 Guaçu Piteri (1967–1970)
 José Liberatti (1970–1973)
 Francisco Rossi (1º Mandate: 1973–1977)
 Guaçu Piteri (1977–1982)
 Humberto Parro (1983–1988)
 Francisco Rossi (2º Mandate: 1989–1992)
 Celso Giglio (1º Mandate: 1993–1996)
 Silas Bortolosso (1997–2000)
 Celso Giglio (2º Mandate: 2001–2004)
 Emidio Pereira de Souza (1º Mandate: 2005–2008)
 Emidio Pereira de Souza (2º Mandate: 2009–2012)
 Antônio Jorge Pereira Lapas (2013–2016)
 Rogério Lins (2017-Today)

Education

Colleges and universities
Serviço Nacional de Aprendizagem Industrial (Escola Senai Nadir Dias de Figueredo)CFP 1.19
Serviço Nacional de Aprendizagem Comercial (SENAC)
Faculdade de Ciências da Fundação Instituto Tecnológico de Osasco (Fac-FITO)
Fundação Instituto Tecnológico de Osasco (FITO)
Faculdade Integração Zona Oeste (Fizo)- Anhanguera
Centro Universitário FIEO – UNIFIEO
Faculdade Fernão Dias
Faculdade FIPEN
São Paulo State Technological College ( FATEC )
Universidade Federal de São Paulo

Culture

Libraries
Biblioteca Municipal Monteiro Lobato
Biblioteca Heitor Sinegalia
Biblioteca Manoel Fiorita
Library of Centro Universitário FIEO
Library of Faculdade de Ciências da FITO

Theatres
Teatro Municipal de Osasco
Espaço Grande Otello
Teatro do Sesi

Spaces of culture
Centro de Eventos Pedro Bortolosso

Museums
Museu Dimitri Sensaud de Lavaud

Schools of education in culture
Escola de Artes César Antonio Salvi

House of events the culture
Casa de Angola
Casa do Violeiro do Brasil

Leisure and natural environment
Parque Ecológico Nelson Vilha Dias
Parque Municipal Dionísio Alvares Mateos
Parque Municipal Chico Mendes
Parque Clóvis Assaf
Park of Lazer Antônio Temporim
Parque Ecológico Jardim Piratininga

Health
Hospitals:
AACD Associação de Assistência à Criança Deficiente
Hospital Cruzeiro do Sul
Hospital e Maternidade Amador Aguiar
Hospital e Maternidade João Paulo II
Hospital Montreal S/A
Hospital Municipal Antônio Gíglio
Hospital Dr. Vivaldo Martins Simões ( Regional )
Hospital e Maternidade Sino Brasileiro

Notable people

Henos Amorina, trade unionist
André Lima Pedro, football player
Antony, football player
Bruno Caboclo, basketball player
Cristiane Rozeira de Souza Silva, football player
Cristiano Lima da Silva, football player
Ederson Moraes, football player
Eduardo Marques de Jesus Passos, football player
Igor Nascimento Soares, football player
Jair da Costa, football player
Júlio Cocielo, famous Youtuber
Júlio Santos, football player
Kléber Giacomance de Souza Freitas, football player
Paulinho Kobayashi, football player
Silvio Pereira, sociologist
Vágner Benazzi, football player
Rodrygo, Football player

Twin towns – sister cities

Osasco is twinned with:

Gyumri, Shirak Province, Armenia
Jining, Shandong,  China
Osasco, Piedmont, Italy
Tsu, Mie, Japan
Viana, Luanda Province,  Angola
Xuzhou, Jiangsu,  China

See also

Greater São Paulo

Bibliography
 SANAZAR, Hirant. Osasco – Sua história, sua gente: Osasco, ed. do author, 2003.
 FAVARÃO, Mazé (apres.). Osasco conta sua história através dos bairros: Osasco, Secretaria de Educação, 2007.
 METROVICHE, Eduardo (org.). Osasco – Um século de fotografia: Osasco, Maxprint Editora, 2007.

References

External links

  Official City Hall Site
  Câmara Osasco citty
 Osasco, Brazil
  Hymn of Osasco in Portuguese

 
1962 establishments in Brazil
Populated places established in 1962